Olimi Karimzod Mastchoh was football club from Tajikistan that dissolved in 2007.

League and domestic cup history

References

Defunct football clubs in Tajikistan
Association football clubs disestablished in 2007
2007 disestablishments in Tajikistan